Aamer Ahmad Sarfraz, Baron Sarfraz (born 25 September 1981) is a British-Pakistani businessman and politician. He was previously a Conservative Party Treasurer, before being nominated for a life peerage by Boris Johnson in the 2019 Dissolution Honours List.

Background

Sarfraz was born in London and grew up in Islamabad, before moving to the United Kingdom in 2002. He is a graduate of Boston University, and the London School of Economics. He is a Member of the Royal College of Defence Studies (RCDS).

Business career

Sarfraz is founder of NetZeroAg, an agriculture business working with smallholder farmers in Asia. Sarfraz was previously a Managing Director at The Electrum Group, a private equity firm, and  a Venture Partner at Draper Associates, an early-stage technology venture capital firm.

Conservative Party fundraising

As a Conservative Party Treasurer, Sarfraz chaired the Business and Entrepreneurs' Forum, described as a 'a network of business leaders that support the Conservative Party', charging £3,000 a year for membership.

Since 2018, he has donated £172,500 to the Conservative Party.

Philanthropy
Sarfraz established The Lord Sarfraz Foundation  which predominantly works with underprivileged communities in Pakistan. The Sarfraz Lecture is held annually at Wolfson College Oxford focusing on the history and culture of Pakistan.

House of Lords
Sarfraz was nominated to the House of Lords on 31 July 2020, and was created Baron Sarfraz, of Kensington in the Royal London Borough of Kensington and Chelsea on 8 September 2020. Sarfraz took his seat in the House of Lords on 28 September 2020, and delivered his maiden speech on 19 October 2020. Sarfraz stated that improving relations between Pakistan and the United Kingdom will be a fundamental part of his new work.

In October 2020, Sarfraz praised the UK government's support for Rohingya Muslims, and called on it to redouble its humanitarian efforts to support religious minorities around the world.

Since January 2021, Sarfraz has been a member of the Science and Technology Committee.

In January 2022, he was appointed as the Prime Minister's Trade Envoy to Singapore.

Lord Sarfraz called on the newly-established UK Infrastructure Bank to invest directly in companies and “do the difficult direct deals, not outsource their responsibilities to third party fund managers". He has advocated for the launch of a UK Central Bank Digital Currency and for the Chief Executive of the FCA to issue guidance to the crypto industry.

Lord Sarfraz criticised the IMF’s strict conditionality on developing countries  and said the UK should use its influence “to ensure the IMF is offering loan terms that countries can accept” and “needs to take a radically new approach to its lending practices”.

Sarfraz has called on the UK government should increase support for the alternative proteins sector and in 2022 launched the UK’s Alternative Proteins Association.

Arms

Sarfraz was granted a coat of arms with a baronial coronet by the College of Arms. His shield contains a depiction of the dome of The Prophet's Mosque in Medina, the first such instance in English heraldry. He was also granted heraldic supporters: a lion for the United Kingdom and a snow leopard for Pakistan. His crest features snow-topped mountains in reference to Islamabad, topped by an Islamic crescent.

His motto is "Faith Service".

References

1981 births
British businesspeople of Pakistani descent
Conservative Party (UK) life peers
British politicians of Pakistani descent
Living people
People from Islamabad
Boston University alumni
Alumni of the London School of Economics
Life peers created by Elizabeth II